.cr is the country code top-level domain (ccTLD) of Costa Rica.

Second-level domains
 .ac.cr - Academic: Universities
 .co.cr - Commercial
 .ed.cr - Education: Colleges, High Schools, etc.
 .fi.cr - Financial institutions such as banks, etc.
 .go.cr - Governmental
 .or.cr - Non-profit organizations
 .sa.cr - Health related institutions.
 .cr - Other Uses

Registrars 
Domains can be bought directly at the registry or through accredited registrars.

References

External links
 IANA's .CR Delegation Info
 Official .cr domain registration website

See also
Internet in Costa Rica

Country code top-level domains
Communications in Costa Rica
Internet in Costa Rica

sv:Toppdomän#C